Rebecca Soler  is an American voice actress based in the New York City area. She has voiced on several audiobooks; her most notable voice work has been the narrator for The Lunar Chronicles series by Marissa Meyer. In anime, she voiced title character Miu Nomura in Piano: The Melody of a Young Girl's Heart, Reanne in Ojamajo Doremi and Battia in Outlanders. In animation, she voiced in Huntik, Viva Piñata, and Winx Club.  She has worked with 4Kids Entertainment, NYAV Post, Media Blasters, Central Park Media and DuArt Film & Video. On stage, she has participated in various theater projects, including a play called Becoming Cuba. She is also a producer of a web series called With Friends Like These.

Biography
Soler grew up in Boston, and moved to Sugar Land, Texas while in high school. She attended Carnegie-Mellon University where she graduated with a Bachelor's in theater.

She got involved in voice-over for anime and animation works that were being dubbed in the New York area. She voiced lead characters in Huntik, Viva Piñata, Winx Club, Teenage Mutant Ninja Turtles, Pokémon and Chaotic. Soler began her voice acting as Joi Reynard from Teenage Mutant Ninja Turtles. She voiced Miu Nomura, the title character in Piano: The Melody of a Young Girl's Heart which was produced by NYAV Post and Right Stuf. She was selected in a fan casting contest poll held by Central Park Media to voice Battia in their dub of the 1986 anime Outlanders.   Soler joined the Winx Club 4Kids dub cast, replacing Dani Schaffel in voicing the character Tecna for season 3.

She began working on audio books after her voice-over agent recommended her for a few projects. She voiced in books by Judy Blume, James Patterson, and Sarah Dessen, and received an AudioFile Earphones Award in 2009 for her narration of Amy Efaw's novel After. Her narration of the Sarah Dessen's Lock and Key was listed among 2009 YALSA Fabulous Films & Amazing Audiobooks for Young Adults. In January 2011, her narration of Marissa Meyer's book Cinder was released by MacMillan Audio.

Soler continues to be active on-screen and in the theater. In 2014, she was involved in a live-action play called Becoming Cuba by the Huntington Theatre Company where she played Martina. She is executive producer of a web series called With Friends Like These which is written by and stars her husband. In 2020, her daughter was born.

Filmography

Animation

Anime

Video games

Live acting
Once a Loser (2013 short film) – Coffee woman
With Friends Like These (2014 web series) – Jess (Ep. 5)

Crew and production roles
 With Friends Like These (2014 web series) – Executive Producer

Discography

Audio books

The Lunar Chronicles series by Marissa Meyer
 Cinder
 Scarlet
 Cress – Audio Publishers Association Audie Award Finalist in Fantasy and Teens categories – 2015
 Fairest
 Winter

Renegades series by Marissa Meyer
 Renegades narrated by Rebecca Soler and Dan Bittner
 Archenemies narrated by Rebecca Soler and Dan Bittner
 Supernova narrated by Rebecca Soler and Dan Bittner

Other books
 Lock and Key by Sarah Dessen
 Virtue Falls by Christina Dodd
 Angel: A Maximum Ride Novel by James Patterson
 Nevermore: The Final Maximum Ride Adventure by James Patterson
 Atlantia by Ally Condie
 Echo by Pam Muñoz Ryan, narrated by Mark Bramhall, David de Vries, MacLeod Andrews and Rebecca Soler. – 2016 Honor Audiobook Odyssey Award
 Heartless by Marissa Meyer
 Sadie by Courtney Summers, narrated by Rebecca Soler, Fred Berman, Dan Bittner, Gabra Zackman
 Cheshire Crossing by Andy Weir

References

External links
 
 
 Rebecca Soler at Crystal Acids English Voice Actor & Production Staff Database
 

21st-century American actresses
American voice actresses
Audiobook narrators
Living people
Actresses from New York City
Actresses from Boston
Place of birth missing (living people)
Year of birth missing (living people)
Actresses from Pittsburgh
American stage actresses
American television actresses
Carnegie Mellon University alumni
People from Sugar Land, Texas
Actresses from Texas